Aguascalientes is a state in North Central Mexico that is divided into eleven municipalities. According to the 2020 Mexican Census, Aguascalientes is the sixth least populous state with  inhabitants and the fourth smallest by land area spanning .

Municipalities in Aguascalientes are administratively autonomous of the state according to the 115th article of the 1917 Constitution of Mexico. Their legal framework derives from the state Constitution and the 2003 Municipal Law for the State of Aguascalientes. Every three years, citizens elect a municipal president (Spanish: presidente municipal) by a plurality voting system who heads a concurrently elected municipal council (ayuntamiento) responsible for providing all the public services for their constituents. The municipal council consists of a variable number of trustees and councillors (regidores y síndicos). Title 9 of the Municipal Law provides for the establishment of unipersonal auxiliary authorities (autoridades auxiliares) to represent local communities in the municipalities.

Municipalities are responsible for public services (such as water and sewerage), street lighting, public safety, traffic, and the maintenance of public parks, gardens and cemeteries. They may also assist the state and federal governments in education, emergency fire and medical services, environmental protection and maintenance of monuments and historical landmarks. Since 1984, they have had the power to collect property taxes and user fees, although more funds are obtained from the state and federal governments than from their own income.

The smallest municipality by population is San José de Gracia with 9,552 residents. The largest municipality by land area is also Aguascalientes which spans , and the smallest is Cosío which spans .

Municipalities

References

 
Aguascalientes